Angelos Messaris (Greek: Άγγελος Μεσσάρης; 1910 – 1978) was a Greek footballer. He played for Panathinaikos and he is widely regarded as the best Greek player of the pre-war era. This is probably also due to the myth that for decades followed his sudden and mysterious early leaving from football. He made his last appearance in the football field on 23 April 1931 at the age of 21, in a match against AEK Athens. Panathinaikos were losing 2-0 but Messaris tied the score with two reverse headers and he received great cheering. His nickname was "Ο Ξανθός Άγγελος, The Blonde Angel"

Career

Playing career
Messaris was descended from the Messaris family of Kefalonia, an island in the Ionian sea, but he was born in Cape Town, South Africa in 1910. In 1924, he moved to Athens, and spent three years at Goudi before transferring to Panathinaikos. His dribbling skills, his ball control together with his versatile mind and hard work quickly propelled him up the ranks in Greek football. During his short career he scored 53 goals: 23 in the Athens FCA Championship, 11 in the Panhellenic Championship, 2 with the Greece national team and 17 in international and friendly games of Panathinaikos and the mixed team of Athens. He was first scorer in the 1929–30 season with 7 goals.

Aggelos Messaris is widely known for his performance in the 8–2 victory over rivals Olympiakos, where he scored three goals and had three assists. This is the largest win either rival had recorded against each other. He also performed well in a 4–1 victory versus Aris, which inspired the following chant: "We scored eight to Olympiakos and four more to Aris. Hooray to Angelos Messaris!" (Greek: "Εβάλαμε οκτώ στον Ολυμπιακό και άλλα τέσσερα στον Άρη. Γεια σου Άγγελε Μεσσάρη!")

After football
After giving up football, Messaris concentrated on his studies at the National Technical University of Athens. Then he returned to South Africa where he concluded his studies and following this he came back to Greece where he became an executive manager at the Doxiadis enterprises. It is said that the reason why he left Panathinaikos rests on the unbearable pressure Apostolos Nikolaidis was putting on him in order to persuade him to commit himself to football and forget about his studies at NTUA. In a short telephone talk that he had with journalist Dimitris Liberopoulos back in 1973 Messaris said: "Please leave me alone... The football player you are asking for died in 1931". He died in 1978 and his funeral was attended by thousands of people.

Honours

Panathinaikos
Panhellenic Championship: 1929–30
Athens FCA Championship: 1928–29, 1929–30, 1930–31

Individual
Panhellenic Championship top scorer: 1929–30
Athens FCA Championship top scorer: 1929–30, 1930–31

External links
pao.gr, Panathinaikos F.C. Official website
6/6: Ο Άγγελος στη γειτονιά των αγγέλων και το μεγάλο άλυτο μυστήριο, greenzone.gr
1921-1930, leoforos.gr
9/3: Τα τρελά εννιάρια του «ψηλού» στο Λίβερπουλ και οι δηλώσεις του Άγγελου Μεσσάρη, greenzone.gr

References

Panathinaikos F.C. players
1910 births
1978 deaths
Greece international footballers
Association football forwards
South African people of Greek descent
Naturalized citizens of Greece
Footballers from Athens
Greek footballers